Antikalamos is a village in the municipality of Kalamata, Messenia, Peloponnese, southern Greece. It is located 2 km southeast of Thouria and 6 km northwest of Kalamata city centre.

Population

See also

List of settlements in Messenia

External links
Antikalamos at the GTP Travel Pages

References

Kalamata
Populated places in Messenia